Tony Hawk in Boom Boom Sabotage is a 2006 computer-animated sports film starring Tony Hawk, produced by Mainframe Entertainment. FUNimation Entertainment distributed the film in the United States, while Alliance Atlantis distributed it in Canada. In Mainframe's earlier versions of the film, it used cel-shaded characters. Some of the early designs can still be seen on Mainframe's website.

Broadcast information
It has been seen on Cartoon Network and released on DVD.

YTV premiered the film on March 12, 2007.

Plot
Disgruntled circus ringleader Larry Grimley and his band of performers plan to kidnap famous celebrity Tony Hawk and his crew to a remote island as ransom due to Mayor John Dullard (who is Grimley's cousin) destroyed his beloved circus, which Grimley swears vengeance. Now its up to a bunch of five skateboarding kids (Kud, Kit, Sage, Switch Mitch and Jessie) to save Tony in time for the Boom Boom HuckJam.

Voice cast
 Noel Callahan as Sage
 Michael Dobson as Larry Grimley / Worker / Homey Clown
 Michael Donovan as TV Narrator / Commercial VO
 Aidan Drummond as Jesse
 Brian Drummond as Hamshank / Chopper Chuck / DJ / Mimic
 Mackenzie Gray as Marshall / Boris / Stilt Walker / Floor Worker
 Tony Hawk as Himself
 Scott Hyland as Frank / Carnie
 David Kaye as Kud
 Colin Murdock as John Dullard / Carnie
 Brenna O'Brien as Jesse
 Nicole Oliver as Reporter / Buzzie Bee
 David Orth as Todd, Carnie
 Carter West as Switch Mitch
 Chiara Zanni as Kit

See also
 List of animated feature films
 List of computer-animated films

References

External links
 

2006 films
2006 direct-to-video films
2006 computer-animated films
Funimation
Rainmaker Studios films
2000s teen fantasy films
Canadian direct-to-video films
American direct-to-video films
2000s English-language films
2000s Canadian films